Stephen Murray (born 9 January 1980) is an English former BMX Dirt rider.

Biography
On Friday 22 June 2007, at the AST Dew Tour BMX Dirt Finals in Baltimore, Murray took a catastrophic fall attempting a double backflip on the final jump in the dirt section. He suffered career-ending injuries to his spinal cord and vertebrae, and became paralyzed below the shoulders. Reports have shown that he can shrug his shoulders, move his toes, his index fingers, and his thumbs.

Murray was a seven-time expert British champion and six-time UK National champion before the age of 16. During his professional BMX career, he was known for his double back flips, 360 back flips, and turndown back flips.  He won the gold medal in BMX Dirt in the Summer 2001 X Games and won gold medals in BMX Dirt at the Gravity Games in back-to-back years (2001 and 2002). He was nominated for ESPN 'BMX rider of the year'.

Since the accident, Murray worked closely with the doctor who treated Christopher Reeve after the actor's accident left him quadriplegic. He now has limited movement in his toes and is also gaining more movements in his hands. He hopes to move to a hand-operated wheelchair in the future.

He is no longer married, but has full custody of his two sons. He resides in Evesham, England.

Murray appeared on the True Geordie Podcast to talk openly about his experience, and the journey of his life. His motivations and dealing with the crash were explored as well.

In 2017, he published a book about his life: Staying Strong: An Immensely Human Story (with John F. McDonald, Lee Martin).

ESPN
BMX Rider of the Year

BMX Championships
Seven-time expert British champion 
Six-time UK National champion

References

External links
 Online photo-biography

BMX riders
English male cyclists
1980 births
Living people
Sportspeople from Newcastle upon Tyne